Allen Russell Saalburg (1899–1987) was an American painter, illustrator, and screen printer born in Rochelle, Illinois. His father was the cartoonist Charles W. Saalburg. He studied at the Art Students League of New York before working in advertising and magazine illustration in the 1920s. A business trip he took to Paris in 1929 with his wife, sketching runway fashion for department stores, led to his first gallery show, at the esteemed Bernheim-Jeune, with his second in New York at a gallery of Louis Bouché. During the 1930s he had regular shows of screenprints on glass (his specialty) and wall panels, and directed a mural division of the Works Progress Administration (WPA), in New York City, overseeing murals in the Central Park Zoo and other New York locations. His murals in the Arsenal of Central Park survive today.

In 1942, the United States Flag Association awarded him the Cross of Honor and Patriotic Service Cross for his painting Flag Over Mt. Vernon. By the 1940s Saalburg had established his own press. He was married to fashion designer Muriel King, and later to Mary Faulconer, a painter. In 1947 after divorce and the loss of his child by his first wife, he moved to Bucks County, Pennsylvania, re-establishing his printing operation as the Canal Press, for the Delaware Canal nearby.

He died in Flemington, New Jersey, at the age of 88. His works can be found in the institutions such as the Whitney Museum of American Art, the Philadelphia Museum of Art, and the Metropolitan Museum of Art.

References

External links
Allen Saalburg papers at the Archives of American Art

1899 births
1987 deaths
20th-century American painters
American graphic designers
People from Rochelle, Illinois
American male painters
Painters from Illinois
People of the New Deal arts projects
20th-century American male artists